The AB-25 class (''Türk'' type) is a class of large patrol craft that was built for the Turkish Navy in the late 1960s and early 1970s. One craft was transferred to Georgia in 1998, two were transferred to Kazakhstan in 1999 and 2001, one was transferred to Azerbaijan in 2000 and the remainder are in service.

Units
 AB-25 (P-125) - out of service in 2000
 AB-26 (P-126) - transferred to Kazakhstan in 1999
 AB-27 (P-127)
 AB-28 (P-128)
 AB-29 (P-129)
 AB-30 (P-130) - transferred to Georgia in 1998
 AB-31 (P-131)
 AB-32 (P-132) - transferred to Kazakhstan in 2001
 AB-33 (P-133) - out of service in 2002
 AB-34 (P-134) - transferred to Azerbaijan in 2000
 AB-35 (P-135)
 AB-36 (P-136)

Sources

Patrol vessels of the Turkish Navy
Patrol boat classes